Kelvinator was an American home appliance manufacturer and a line of domestic refrigerators that was the namesake of the company. Although as a company it is now defunct, the name still exists as a brand name owned by Electrolux AB. It takes its name from William Thomson, 1st Baron Kelvin, who developed the concept of absolute zero and for whom the Kelvin temperature scale is named. The name was thought appropriate for a company that manufactured ice-boxes and refrigerators.

History

Kelvinator was founded on September 18, 1914, in Detroit, Michigan, United States, by engineer Nathaniel B. Wales who introduced his idea for a practical electric refrigeration unit for the home to Edmund Copeland and Arnold Goss.

Wales, a young inventor, secured financial backing from Arnold Goss, then secretary of the Buick Automobile company, to develop the first household mechanical refrigerators to be marketed under the name "Electro-Automatic Refrigerating Company." After producing a number of experimental models, Wales selected one for manufacturing.

In February 1916, the name of the company was changed to "Kelvinator Company" in honor of the Irish-Scottish physicist, Lord Kelvin (William Thomson, 1st Baron Kelvin), the discoverer of absolute zero. Kelvinator was among some two dozen home refrigerators introduced to the U.S. market in 1916. In 1918 Kelvinator introduced the first refrigerator with any type of automatic control.

Frustrated by iceboxes, the Grand Rapids Refrigerator Company introduced a porcelain lined "Leonard Cleanable" ice cabinet. Kelvinator began buying Leonard's boxes for its electric refrigerated models. By 1923, the Kelvinator Company held 80% of the American market for electric refrigerators.

On July 3, 1925, Kelvinator bought Nizer Corporation in a tri-party merger valued at $20,000,000.

In 1926, the company acquired Leonard, which had been founded in 1881. Kelvinator concentrated its entire appliance production at the Grand Rapids factory in 1928. That year, George W. Mason assumed control of Kelvinator. Under his leadership, the company lowered its costs while increasing market share through 1936.

In 1936, Kelvinator introduced the "Kelvin Home", which was one of the earliest attempts to market in-home central air conditioning and heating to ordinary consumers. Customers could choose from a number of different home designs, all of which were equipped with climate control systems and the latest electric appliances, and were advertised to cost about $7,500 ($151,523 in 2022)  for a six-room house. The first Kelvin Home shown to the public was located in Livonia, Michigan and attracted thousands of visitors. A number of surviving homes are registered historic properties, including several in the Rosedale Gardens Historic District in Livonia and the Kelvinator House in Albuquerque, New Mexico.

British operations
In 1926, Kelvinator Limited, England, was started in London. From simple merchandising of the products of the American factories, it grew until it was producing much of its own equipment for the British market. In 1946, it was considered that the time was ripe for this unit to expand and be self-contained in its manufacture of Kelvinator Equipment, and the London manufacturing activities were moved to Crewe and greatly expanded with a further  of floor space. The Crewe factory was shared with Rolls-Royce Motors, but burned down in the 1950s and was replaced by a new facility in Bromborough, Cheshire.

Italian manufacturer Candy bought the operation in 1979 together with the use of the Kelvinator brand name in the UK and produced both Candy and Kelvinator products until it closed around 2000.

Merger with Nash Motors
On October 27, 1936, it was announced that Nash Motors and Kelvinator Corp. were merging. The merger took effect on January 4, 1937, to form Nash-Kelvinator Corporation as part of a deal that placed George W. Mason at the helm of the combined company. 

In 1952, it acquired the Altorfer Bros. Company, which made home laundry equipment under the ABC brand name.

World War II

Between 1939 and 1945, the complete manufacturing facilities of the factories' group were turned over to the manufacturing of military supplies. With the exception of one-ton, two-wheeled truck cargo trailers and some refrigerators, Nash-Kelvinator did not manufacture products related to its pre-war operations. It became the largest producer of helicopters in the U.S. during the war by making the Sikorsky R-6A Hoverfly II]], the most advanced helicopter design of the war. Other wartime products included three- and four-blade propellers, optical equipment and binoculars as well as Pratt & Whitney R-2800 Double Wasp radial aircraft engines. The Kelvinator refrigerator facility in Grand Rapids, Michigan, had up to 5,000 employees when it produced airplane propellers and engine parts. Nash-Kelvinator placed 27th in the value of World War II production contracts that were awarded to U.S. firms.

In Britain, Kelvinator of London contributed to the field of testing airplane components at ultra-low temperatures, and instruments under high altitude conditions, research that was credited as saving the lives of many Allied aircrews.

The company pledged to introduce the scientific discoveries gained during the war production into its appliances to make them more useful and efficient.

Integration into American Motors
Nash-Kelvinator became a division of American Motors (AMC) when Nash merged with Hudson in 1954. Kelvinator introduced the first auto-defrost models. Kelvinator refrigerators included shelves on the inside of their doors and special compartments for frozen juice containers in the freezer. It also pioneered the side-by-side refrigerator freezer in the early 1950s. In the 1960s, Kelvinator refrigerators introduced "picture frame" doors on some models allowing owners to decorate their appliance to match décor of their kitchens.

Under the leadership of Roy D. Chapin Jr., AMC sold off its Kelvinator operations in 1968. (AMC then purchased the Jeep brand from Kaiser Industries in 1970.) Kelvinator joined White Consolidated Industries, a company that later acquired the rights to Frigidaire (originally owned by General Motors), Gibson, and White-Westinghouse product lines. Electrolux of Sweden acquired White Consolidated Industries in 1986, and combined WCI brands with Electrolux-owned Tappan to become WCI Major Appliances Group.

In the early 1990s, the name of the Dublin, Ohio based holding company changed to Frigidaire Company.

In 1997, it was reorganized into Electrolux North America Products.

Legacy
In North America, Electrolux continues to sell (under the Kelvinator Commercial brand) a range of commercial refrigeration equipment.

The Kelvinator brand is used in Argentina for a wide variety of appliances marketed by Radio Victoria Fueguina in Tierra del Fuego. The factory is in this province.

In the Philippines, the Kelvinator brand was licensed in 1977 to Concepcion Industries Inc. (now Concepcion Industrial Corporation) who continues to sell whitegoods under this brand. 

In Australia, Kelvinator Australia Ltd was formed in 1934, and manufactured and distributed products under licence from several US companies, including Kelvinator. In 1980, they became part of the Australian-owned 
Email Limited group of companies, whose appliance division was subsequently sold to the Swedish-owned Electrolux Group in 2001. Refrigerators and air conditioners continue to be sold under the Kelvinator brand by the Electrolux Group.

In India, the Kelvinator brand was revived in 2019, when the retail arm of Reliance Retail signed a licensing, manufacturing, marketing and distribution deal with Electrolux. They currently sell a range of appliances and whitegoods under the Kelvinator brand.

As late as 2014, residents of Robeson County, North Carolina used "Kelvinator" to generically refer to refrigerators, due to the former presence of a Kelvinator factory in their county.

References

American Motors
Nash Motors
Home appliance manufacturers of the United States
Electrolux brands
American companies established in 1914
Manufacturing companies established in 1914
1914 establishments in Michigan
Defunct manufacturing companies based in Detroit
1986 mergers and acquisitions
Refrigerators